We See, subtitled Thelonious Monk Songbook, is a live album by soprano saxophonist Steve Lacy, which was recorded in Switzerland in 1992 and first released on the hat ART label in 1993. The album was rereleased in 2002 with an additional track from the concert.

Reception

The Allmusic review by Glenn Astarita stated "Essentially, this a relatively straightforward set consisting of moderate to up-tempo swing vamps, accelerated by the saxophonist's gleaming choruses and Monk-like permutations. Lacy and associates perform these works with a deeply personalized and undeniably buoyant demeanor. ... this effort shines forth with the qualities that might parallel the birth of a sun-drenched summer's day". BBC Music's John Eyles called it "one of the essential Lacy discs" and observed "throughout his massive discography, Lacy has repeatedly returned to the compositions of Monk. From his earliest group albums such as Reflections, Evidence and School Days, through solo recordings like Only Monk and More Monk, to the recent Monk's Dream - a period of well over forty years - Lacy has established himself as the greatest Monk interpreter, bar none. In the process, Lacy has kept Monk's compositions in the spotlight and immeasurably enhanced Monk's reputation as a composer. True symbiosis".

Track listing
All compositions by Thelonious Monk except where noted
 "We See" – 6:56
 "Shuffle Boil" – 4:31
 "Evidence" – 6:07
 "Reflections" – 3:28
 "Ruby, My Dear'' – 4:43
 "Eronel" – 3:52
 "Monk's Mood" – 5:31
 "Thelonious" – 5:32 Additional track on CD reissue
 "Misterioso" – 7:55
 "Well, You Needn't" – 7:33
 "Hanky-Panky" (Steve Lacy) – 8:02

Personnel
Steve Lacy – soprano saxophone
Steve Potts – alto saxophone, soprano saxophone
Hans Kennel – trumpet, flugelhorn
Sonhando Estwick – vibes
Jean-Jacques Avenel – bass 
John Betsch – drums

References

Steve Lacy (saxophonist) live albums
1993 live albums
Hathut Records live albums